The following is a list of the municipalities (comuni) of Liguria, Italy.

There are 234 municipalities in Liguria (as of January 2019):

67 in the Metropolitan City of Genoa
66 in the Province of Imperia
32 in the Province of La Spezia
69 in the Province of Savona

List

See also
List of municipalities of Italy

References

 
Geography of Liguria
Liguria